Mathare Youth Sports Association (MYSA) is a sports development aid organization in Mathare, a collection of slums in Nairobi. In sports it focuses mainly on association football, and furthermore it is active in the field of community building.

History and background 
MYSA was founded in 1987 by Canadian Bob Munro who was an advisor at the time for the United Nations in Nairobi, for environmental policy, water resources management and sustainable development. In Mathare children led him to a football field that was covered with flinders and trash. With cleaning the field the first step was made for MYSA.

On August 22, 1987, a youth competition was started with 27 clubs. In 2010, 14,000 children in 1,200 teams are active. Meanwhile, MYSA has grown to be the greatest youth association of Africa. Since 1992 there is football for girls as well and in 2006 one-third of the players were girls. MYSA has its own professional football club, Mathare United F.C., which meanwhile has provided four players to the national football team of Kenya. Football players Doreen Nabwire, Dennis Oliech of AJ Auxerre and Jamal Mohammed once started their careers at MYSA.

Since its start, MYSA is dedicated to enhancing social proficiencies through the teaching of football. Children can score points at their participation in 'Clean Up Projects', and with matches they have won. Very diligent players can have their school expenses paid. When there is no place available at school, one can still use the library. During theater plays there is also attention to instruction on AIDS, drugs and prostitution. Furthermore, it teaches leadership, photography, music, and more.

MYSA was twice nominated for a Nobel Peace Prize and is financially supported by the Royal Dutch Football Association and the Norwegian Strømme Foundation. In 1999 MYSA won the UNEP Global 500 Award for environmental innovation and in 2001 the CAF/African Youth Development Award. In 2003 MYSA was honored with a Prince Claus Award from the Netherlands and in 2004 it received a Sport for Good Award of the Laureus World Sports Awards.

References

External links 
Official website

Football in Kenya
Sport in Nairobi
Sports organisations of Kenya